Phraates V ( Frahāt), also known by the diminutive version of his name, Phraataces (also spelled Phraatakes), was the King of Kings of the Parthian Empire from 2 BC to 4 AD. He was the younger son of Phraates IV and Musa, who ruled with him.

Under Phraates V, a war threatened to break out between the Parthian and Roman empires over the control of Armenia and Mesopotamia. Although Augustus had sent his adopted son Gaius Caesar to invade Iran, in 1 AD the two sides agreed a peace treaty, by which once again Armenia was recognized as being in the Roman sphere. Phraates V was in return acknowledged as the rightful Parthian king, which was of high importance to him, due to his insecure position in the country. In 4 AD, Phraates V and his mother fled to Rome after being expelled by the Parthian nobility, who crowned Orodes III as king.

Name 
Phraátēs is the Greek form of the Parthian Frahāt (𐭐𐭓𐭇𐭕), itself from the Old Iranian *Frahāta- ("gained, earned"). The Modern Persian version is Farhād. Phraates V was regularly known by the diminutive version of his name, Phraataces, meaning "the small Phraates".

Background 

Phraates V was the son of the Phraates IV and his Roman wife Musa, who was originally an Italian slave-girl given to him by the Roman emperor Augustus after a treaty in 20 BC in which the Romans returned Phraates IV his kidnapped son in return for the lost legionary standards taken at Carrhae in 53 BC, as well as any surviving prisoners of war. The Parthians viewed this exchange as a small price to pay to regain the prince. It was reportedly under her influence, that Phraates IV in 10/9 BC sent his four first-born sons to Rome in order to prevent conflict over his succession. In 2 BC, Musa had Phraates IV poisoned and made herself, along with Phraates V, the co-rulers of the Parthian empire. According to the 1st-century Roman historian Josephus, he heard a rumour that Musa enjoyed sexual relations with her son. This and the coinage of Musa with Phraates V, led to some scholars believe that the two had married. However, there is no evidence that supports this claim; neither under the Parthians, nor their Persian predecessors—the Achaemenids—is there reliable evidence that marriage was practised between parents and their children.

Reign 

At his accession, Phraates V inherited a long dispute between the Parthians and the Romans over Armenia and Mesopotamia. As a result, Augustus dispatched an army under his adopted son Gaius Caesar to capture both regions. Before war broke out, they were met by an emissary of Phraates V, who demanded the king's brothers be returned to him. Augustus wrote a mocking response in a letter to Phraates V, which simply addressed him as "Phraates". He demanded that Phraates relinquish his crown and give up his claims to Armenia. Not intimidated, Phraates V replied back—according to the classical Roman historian Cassius Dio—"in a generally haughty tone, styling himself King of Kings and addressing Augustus simply as Caesar".

Ultimately, the two powers agreed to come to terms through diplomacy: a peace-treaty was agreed in 1 AD, which made Armenia a Roman vassal state, whilst the Romans agreed to acknowledge the Parthian Empire as its equal, and Phraates V as its rightful ruler. It was important to Phraates V that he was acknowledged by the Romans, due to his insecure domestic position in the country. However, this strategy backfired. In 4 AD, the Parthian nobility, already discontented with the son of an Italian slave-girl occupying the throne, were further angered by his acknowledgement of Roman suzerainty in Armenia, expelling Phraates V and Musa from the Parthian throne.  Both fled to Rome, where Augustus welcomed them. The Parthian nobility then placed Orodes III on the throne.

Coinage 

Phraates V's later reverse coins notably have an image of his mother, Musa, with a circular legend labelling her as "heavenly", contrary to the square legends which had been typical on Parthian coin mints. Furthermore, the title of basilissa ("queen") is also given to her, which was not necessarily only used by the wife of the king in the Hellenistic era, but also other royal women. Like his father, Phraates V's obverse coins depicts a figure resembling the Greek goddess Nike holding a ring and diadem behind his head. In the Parthian era, Iranians used Hellenistic iconography to portray their divine figures, thus the figure can be associated with the Avestan khvarenah, i.e. kingly glory. Rarely, a fire temple is depicted on the reverse of his coins. Likewise, the title of Phraates V on his coinage remained the same as that of his father: "[coin] of the King of Kings, Arsakes, Just, Benefactor, Illustrious, Philhellene."

References

Sources 
 
 
 
  
 
 
 
 
  
 
 
 
 
 
 

1st-century BC Parthian monarchs
1st-century Iranian people
Iranian people of Roman descent
1st-century Parthian monarchs
1st-century deaths
1st-century BC Babylonian kings
1st-century Babylonian kings